Sébastien Roudet (born 16 June 1981) is a French former professional football midfielder.

References

External links

Living people
1981 births
People from Montluçon
Sportspeople from Allier
Association football midfielders
French footballers
France youth international footballers
Ligue 1 players
Ligue 2 players
LB Châteauroux players
OGC Nice players
Valenciennes FC players
RC Lens players
FC Sochaux-Montbéliard players
Footballers from Auvergne-Rhône-Alpes